The third generation of Mercedes-Benz SLK-Class (SLC-Class) (series R172) was launched in Stuttgart in January 2011, with a subsequent public launch at the 2011 Geneva Motor Show,  with international sales starting spring 2011. It is the successor of R171 series of roadsters which was originally launched in 2004. The SLC was discontinued after the 2020 model year.

Initial release

The design follows the themes of both the first and second generations, but incorporating radiator air intake design from the 190 SL roadster from the 1950s, and front end inspired by Mercedes-Benz SLS AMG Coupé and Mercedes-Benz CLS-Class (W218).

"Edition 1" model includes special paint finish SHAPE in glacier grey, panoramic vario-roof, Dynamic Handling package, AMG bodystyling, two-tone designo nappa leather with contrasting topstitching, AIRSCARF, ambient lighting and more.

Orders began in from 17 January 2011, and arrived to dealer showrooms on 26 March 2011. Early models include SLK 200 BlueEFFICIENCY, SLK 250 BlueEFFICIENCY, SLK 350 BlueEFFICIENCY. US models went on sale in 2011 as 2012 model year vehicles.

For 2014 model year, minor changes were made to standard equipment, and AMG Sports package renamed to AMG Line.

Roadster Pure (2011-2020)

SLK 250 CDI (2011-2020)
It is the first version of SLK-class vehicle with diesel engine. Ordering of SLK 250 CDI began on 13 September 2011. Early models include 7G-TRONIC PLUS automatic transmission, followed by six-speed manual transmission models in the second quarter of 2012. A BlueEFFICIENCY version of the SLK 250 CDI with 6-speed manual transmission was added to the range in the spring of 2012. SLK 250 CDI BlueEFFICIENCY with 7-speed automatic transmission is sold in Germany and the UK.The dimensions of the car is : Length: , Width: , Height: , Wheelbase: .

SLK 55 AMG (2012-2015)
The SLK 55 AMG was unveiled at the 2011 Frankfurt Motor Show, and went on sale in January 2012.

Equipment
The third generation continues with the two-piece metal folding roof known as a Vario Roof, which includes a choice of a roof painted in the vehicle colour, a panoramic vario-roof with dark-tinted windows, or the panoramic vario-roof with MAGIC SKY CONTROL, which contains glass roof that can be switched to light or dark.

Engines

ECO start/stop is included for all engine models.

Transmissions

Performance

Facelift (SLC-Class)
In December 2015 Mercedes presented to the press the new version named SLC-Class, announcing a March 2016 launch date to coincide with the 20th anniversary of the original SLK.

 SLC 180 4 cylinders, 1.6L turbo, 156 PS, 250 Nm, 5.6 L/100 km, 127 g /km, 0– in 7.9 s, 
 SLC 200 4 cylinders, 2.0L turbo, 184 PS, 300 Nm, 5.7 L/100 km, 133 g/km, 0– in 7.0s, 
 SLC 300 4 cylinders, 2.0L turbo, 245 PS, 370 Nm, 5.8 L/100 km, 134 g/km, 0– in 5.8s, 
 AMG SLC 43 V6, 3.0L biturbo, 367 - 390 PS, 520 Nm, 7.8 L/100 km, 178 g/km, 0– in 4.7s, 
 SLC 250d 4 cylinders, 2.1L turbodiesel 204 PS, 4.4 L/100 km, 114 g/km, 0– in 6.6s, 
All versions have as standard the 9G-Tronic automatic gearbox, except for the 180 and 200 in which a manual 6-speed gearbox is standard, although the automatic is available in option.

References

Notes

Bibliography

External links
Press kit:
The new Mercedes-Benz SLK: Passion meets efficiency
The new SLK 55 AMG: Top marks in all disciplines

R172
R172
Cars introduced in 2011